The Human Christ: The Search For The Historical Jesus was written by Charlotte Allen and published in 1998. .  Charlotte Allen discusses how the perception of Christ has evolved throughout history, touching upon the time of Christ.  The narrative goes on to document how the early Christians lived in strife with Jews and Pagans.

The book later leads to a demonstration of how Sir Isaac Newton changed society and caused a division in religious practice as science and logic ignited the minds of academics.

1998 non-fiction books
1998 in Christianity
Christian literature